In the 2011 Copa América, the main disciplinary action taken against players came in the form of red and yellow cards.

Any player picking up a red card was expelled from the pitch and automatically banned for his country's next match, whether via a straight red or second yellow. After a straight red card, FIFA would conduct a hearing and could extend this ban beyond one match. If the ban extended beyond the end of the finals (i.e. if a player was sent off in the match in which his team was eliminated), it had to be served in the team's next competitive international match(es).

Disciplinary statistics
Total number of yellow cards: 128
Average yellow cards per match: 4.92
Total number of red cards:  14
Average red cards per match: 0.54
First yellow card: Wálter Flores (Bolivia against Argentina)
First red card: Randall Brenes (Costa Rica against Colombia)
Fastest yellow card from kick off: 1 minute (Luis Advíncula; Peru against Colombia and Yoshimar Yotún; Peru against Uruguay)
Fastest yellow card after coming on as substitute: 1 minutes (Édgar Barreto and Elvis Marecos; both Paraguay against Brazil)
Latest yellow card in a match without extra time: 90+4 minutes (Franklin Lucena; Venezuela against Brazil)
Fastest dismissal from kick off: 28 minutes (Randall Brenes; Costa Rica against Colombia)
Fastest dismissal of a substitute: None
Latest dismissal in a match without extra time: 90+4 minutes (Tomás Rincón; Venezuela against Chile)
Latest dismissal in a match with extra time: 103 minutes (Antolín Alcaraz; Paraguay against Brazil and Lucas Leiva; Brazil against Paraguay)
Least time difference between two yellow cards given to the same player: 5 minutes (Ronald Rivero; Bolivia against Costa Rica)
Most yellow cards (team): 18 (Uruguay)
Most red cards (team): 2 (Bolivia, Chile, Paraguay, Peru, Venezuela)
Fewest yellow cards (team): 2 (Ecuador)
Most yellow cards (player): 4 (Martín Cáceres)
Most red cards (player): 2 (Tomás Rincón)
Most yellow cards (match): 11 (Argentina against Uruguay)
Most red cards (match): 2 (Bolivia against Costa Rica; Chile against Peru; Argentina against Uruguay; Brazil against Paraguay and Chile against Venezuela)
Fewest yellow cards (match): 0 (Venezuela against Ecuador)
Most cards in one match: 11 yellow cards and 2 red cards (Argentina against Uruguay)

Detailed statistics

By match

By referee

By team

By player
99 red cards
 Tomás Rincón

1 red card

 Javier Mascherano
 Wálter Flores
 Ronald Rivero
 Lucas Leiva

 Jean Beausejour
 Gary Medel
 Randall Brenes
 Antolín Alcaraz

 Jonathan Santana
 Giancarlo Carmona
 Juan Manuel Vargas
 Diego Pérez

4 yellow cards
 Martín Cáceres

3 yellow cards

 Ronald Rivero
 Jonathan Santana

 Sebastián Coates

 Diego Pérez

2 yellow cards

 Fernando Gago
 Ezequiel Lavezzi
 Javier Mascherano
 Gabriel Milito
 Carlos Tevez
 Jhasmani Campos
 Luis Gutiérrez
 André Santos
 Pablo Contreras

 Gary Medel
 Arturo Vidal
 Francisco Calvo
 Óscar Duarte
 David Guzmán
 Paul Aguilar
 Hiram Mier
 Víctor Cáceres
 Enrique Vera

 Adan Balbín
 Rinaldo Cruzado
 Álvaro González
 Luis Suárez
 César González
 Franklin Lucena
 Giancarlo Maldonado

1 yellow card

 Lucas Biglia
 Nicolás Burdisso
 Pablo Zabaleta
 Javier Zanetti
 Lorgio Álvarez
 José Luis Chávez
 Wálter Flores
 Marcelo Moreno
 Dani Alves
 Jádson
 Lucas Leiva
 Maicon
 Alexandre Pato
 Thiago Silva
 Claudio Bravo
 Marco Estrada
 Mauricio Isla
 Gonzalo Jara
 Alexis Sánchez
 Jorge Valdivia
 Abel Aguilar

 Fredy Guarín
 Dayro Moreno
 Carlos Sánchez
 Camilo Zúñiga
 Diego Madrigal
 José Salvatierra
 Oswaldo Minda
 Christian Noboa
 Javier Aquino
 Rafael Márquez Lugo
 Édgar Pacheco
 Diego Reyes
 Héctor Reynoso
 Édgar Barreto
 Lucas Barrios
 Marcelo Estigarribia
 Elvis Marecos
 Iván Piris
 Nelson Valdez
 Darío Verón
 Pablo Zeballos

 Santiago Acasiete
 Luis Advíncula
 Aldo Corzo
 Paolo Guerrero
 Salomón Libman
 Carlos Lobatón
 Christian Ramos
 Renzo Revoredo
 Alberto Rodríguez
 Juan Manuel Vargas
 Yoshimar Yotún
 Walter Gargano
 Diego Lugano
 Álvaro Pereira
 Maxi Pereira
 Gabriel Cichero
 Grenddy Perozo
 José Manuel Rey
 Salomón Rondón
 Roberto Rosales

Fair Play Award
The Fair Play Award was given to the team with the best overall discipline throughout the tournament. Teams were given a certain number of points—15 in the first stage, 5 in the quarter-finals, and 10 points for the remaining four teams—from which points were deducted depending on the infraction. The team that advanced past the first stage with the most points was awarded the trophy. Teams that dropped below zero points were excluded from winning the award.

The four semi-finalists (Paraguay, Peru, Uruguay, and Venezuela) were the only teams considered for the Fair Play Award. After a post-match brawl in the semi-finals, Paraguay and Venezuela were excluded from winning the award. Peru and Uruguay finished the tournament with the same number of points. Since Uruguay had fewer players handed a red card during the tournament, they won the Fair Play Award.

References

External links

Disciplinary Record